Gheorghe Benția (1 July 18971 September 1975) was a Romanian rugby union player. He played as a wing.

He had 4 caps for Romania, from 1919 to 1924, without ever scoring. His first game was a 21–0 loss to the United States, for the Inter-Allied Games, in Paris. He played both games at the 1924 Olympic Tournament, where Romania reached the 3rd place, winning his first ever bronze medal. He was never capped again for his National Team.

See also
 List of Romania national rugby union players

References

External links
 
 
 

1897 births
Year of death missing
Romanian rugby union players
Rugby union wings
Olympic rugby union players of Romania
Rugby union players at the 1924 Summer Olympics
Romania international rugby union players
Medalists at the 1924 Summer Olympics
Olympic bronze medalists for Romania